Anastasia Rybka (sometimes Anastasiia Rybka) is a Ukrainian-American table tennis player and coach.

Rybka was born in Ukraine on March 25, 1993. She is from Kyiv. Her father is Nikolay Rybka. She is left-handed.

She began playing table tennis at the age of nine years. She eventually reached the number-one spot in her age category in Ukraine. At age eighteen, she won a Ukrainian national gold medal in each possible juniors category (singles, doubles, mixed doubles, and teams), in the same tournament. She also coached in the Ukraine.

She received a table-tennis scholarship to Texas Wesleyan University to study toward a master's degree in education. She both played and coached there. She later moved to Los Angeles to work as a coach.

She is considered one of the Texas Wesleyan table tennis team's best-known alumni.

References

External links 
 

Living people
Table tennis coaches
Ukrainian female table tennis players
Ukrainian emigrants to the United States
1993 births
Sportspeople from Kyiv